The Bromsgrove Guild of Applied Arts (1898–1966) was a company of modern artists and designers associated with the Arts and Crafts Movement, founded by Walter Gilbert. The guild worked in metal, wood, plaster, bronze, tapestry, glass and other mediums.

The Guild received a Royal Warrant in 1908.

The Guild's most famous works on public display are the main gates of Buckingham Palace and the Canada Gate both part of Sir Aston Webb's memorial scheme to Queen Victoria.

Unlike many other Arts & Crafts companies that faded away after a few decades, for instance the William Morris company, the Bromsgrove Guild survived until the early 1960s.

Famous works

 Liver birds, Royal Liver Building, Liverpool
 Trim on the 
 Trim on the 
 The statue of Hygieia at Chequers
 Plasterwork at Averley, Glasgow.
 Plasterwork at the Central Station Hotel, Glasgow.
 Stained Glass at Stoneleigh, Glasgow.
 The gates and sculpture at the Phoenix Assurance Building, Glasgow.
 Trim on the Cunard War Memorial, Liverpool.
 English altar and rails St Paul's Church, Bedford.
 Various items at Holy Trinity Church, Southport.
 Chancel gates and reredos in Liverpool Cathedral 
 Items at Church of the Holy Trinity and St Mary, Dodford, Worcestershire
 The main gates of Buckingham Palace
 Terpsichore on the facade of the Fortune Theatre
 The mosaic in the pedimented gable at 50 Anlaby Road, Hull
 Choir Stalls at All Saints Cathedral, Halifax

Notes

Sources

19th-century art groups
Arts and Crafts movement